Josef Kříž (4 February 1895 – 1988) was a Czech architect. His work was part of the architecture event in the art competition at the 1936 Summer Olympics.

References

1895 births
1988 deaths
20th-century Czech architects
Olympic competitors in art competitions
Architects from Prague